Gibson Osahumen Yah (born 27 September 2003) is a Dutch footballer who plays as a midfielder for Jong FC Utrecht.

International career
Born in the Netherlands, Yah is of Nigerian descent through his Parents. He is a youth international for the Netherlands.

On 28 May 2022, Yah moved to Jong FC Utrecht.

Career statistics

Club

Notes

References

External links
 Career stats & Profile - Voetbal International

2003 births
Living people
Dutch footballers
Netherlands youth international footballers
Dutch people of Nigerian descent
Association football midfielders
AFC Ajax players
Jong Ajax players
Jong FC Utrecht players
Eerste Divisie players